Julie Harvey may refer to:
 Julie Harvey (footballer)
 Julie Harvey (artist)